Magnus of Norway may refer to:
 Magnus I of Norway (1024–1047)
 Magnus II of Norway (1048–1069)
 Magnus III of Norway (1073–1103)
 Magnus IV of Norway (c. 1115–1139)
 Magnus Haraldsson of Norway (c. 1035-1045)
 Magnus V of Norway (1156–1184)
 Magnus VI of Norway (1238–1280)
 Magnus VII of Norway (1316–1374)
 Prince Sverre Magnus of Norway (b. 2005)